Irma Gloria Ochoa Salinas (born 23 April 1939), commonly known as Lucha Moreno, is a Mexican singer and actress.

Career 
She debuted in films singing "La noche de mi mal" in Asesinos, S.A. (1957), starring Resortes and Kitty de Hoyos. She then starred in No soy monedita de oro (1959), with Fernando Casanova and Cuco Sánchez; El gato (1961), with Joaquín Cordero; Las hijas del Amapolo (1962), with José Elías Moreno and Carmela Rey; Aquí está tu enamorado (1963), with Antonio Aguilar, Flor Silvestre, and Manuel López Ochoa; Lupe Balazos (1964), with Julio Aldama; Escuela para solteras (1965), with an all-star cast; and Los dos apóstoles (1966), with Luis Aguilar. She also participated in telenovelas. With her husband, singer José Juan, she formed the successful duet Lucha Moreno y José Juan.

Discography

Singles 
 «Anoche estuve llorando» (Columbia, 1957)
 «Vencida» (Columbia, 1957)

Studio albums 
 Lucha Moreno (Orfeón 12-22)
 Acuarelas provincianas (Orfeón 12-38)
 Rancheras de siempre (Orfeón 12-52)
 Ecos de la revolución (Orfeón 12-103)
 Éxitos de Lucha Moreno (Orfeón 12-214)

References

External links 
 

1939 births
Living people
Mexican film actresses
Mexican television actresses
Ranchera singers
Singers from Nuevo León
20th-century Mexican actresses
21st-century Mexican actresses
20th-century Mexican women singers
21st-century Mexican women singers
Women in Latin music